Isidore Philip Tisson (12 September 1985 – 30 August 2010) was an international footballer from Saint Lucia. Tisson played as a midfielder, and played club football for clubs throughout the Caribbean including Canaries, Anse La Raye Young Stars and Helenites.

Tisson was shot to death on 30 August 2010 in Brooklyn, New York City.

References

1985 births
2010 deaths
Deaths by firearm in Brooklyn
Male murder victims
Saint Lucian footballers
Saint Lucia international footballers
Association football midfielders
People murdered in New York City
Saint Lucian murder victims